Tavares Seaplane Base  is a city-owned, public-use seaplane base located one nautical mile (1.85 km) southeast of the central business district of Tavares, a city in Lake County, Florida, United States.

Facilities 

The seaplane landing area on Lake Dora is designated 9/27 and measures 3,000 by 200 feet (914 x 61 m).

References

External links 
 Tavares Seaplane Base & Marina
 Aerial image as of 25 January 1999 from USGS The National Map
 

Airports in Florida
Transportation buildings and structures in Lake County, Florida
Seaplane bases in the United States